Oh Soo-yeon (born October 4, 1968) is a South Korean television screenwriter. She is best known for writing the hit dramas Autumn in My Heart and Winter Sonata, her collaborations with director Yoon Seok-ho which are credited for helping launch the Korean Wave.

Filmography
Love Rain (KBS2, 2012)
Star's Lover (SBS, 2008)
Wedding (KBS2, 2005) 
MBC Best Theater "바다 아저씨께" (MBC, 2003)
Love Letter (MBC, 2003)
Winter Sonata (KBS2, 2002)
Four Sisters (MBC, 2001)
Autumn in My Heart (KBS2, 2000)
All About Eve (MBC, 2000)
Ad Madness (KBS2, 1999)
LA Arirang (SBS, 1995-1999)
New York Story (SBS, 1998)
The Angel Within (KBS2, 1997)
Papa (KBS2, 1996)
이별하는 여섯 단계 (KBS, 1995)
Feelings (KBS2, 1994)
오박사네 사람들 (SBS, 1993-1994)
Good morning, Yeongdong! (KBS, 1993-1994)
특집극 시인을 위하여 (KBS, 1993)

References

External links
 
 

Living people
South Korean screenwriters
1968 births
South Korean television writers
Place of birth missing (living people)
Ewha Womans University alumni